The Taurus World Stunt Awards is a yearly award ceremony held midyear that honors stunt performers in movies. It is held each year in Los Angeles. The first awards were given out in 2001. The deciding committee has been around since the year 2000. The awards were created by Dietrich Mateschitz, the founder of Red Bull. The awards statue was sculpted by Austrian artist , and is a figure in the form of a winged bull.

Taurus Lifetime Achievement Award 
 2001: Hal Needham
 2002: Buddy Van Horn
 2003: Terry Leonard
 2004: Ronnie Rondell Jr.
 2005: Vic Armstrong
 2007: Jeannie Epper
 2010: Jophery C. Brown
 2011: Loren Janes
 2012: Glenn R. Wilder
 2013: David R. Ellis
 2014: Buddy Joe Hooker
 2015: Gary Combs
 2016: Andy Armstrong
 2017: Gene LeBell
 2018: Charlie Picerni
 2019: Billy Burton

2001 
Films in alphabetical order
 The Cell (2000)
 Best high work
 Charlie's Angels (2000)
 Best aerial work
 Best speciality stunt
 Gladiator (2000)
 Best fight
 Best work with an animal
 Gone in 60 Seconds (2000)
 Best driving
 Hollow Man (2000)
 Best fire
 Me, Myself & Irene (2000)
 Best work with a vehicle
 Mission: Impossible 2 (2000)
 Best stunt coordination – feature film
 Best stunt coordination - sequence
 The Perfect Storm (2000)
 Best water work

2002 
Films in alphabetical order
 Behind Enemy Lines (2001)
 Best aerial work
 The Fast and the Furious (2001)
 Best driving
 Best overall stunt by a stunt man
 Best overall stunt by a stunt woman
 Best stunt coordination – feature film
 Best work with a vehicle
 Jurassic Park III (2001)
 Best water work
 A Knight's Tale (2001)
 Hardest hit
 Best work with an animal
 The Last Castle (2001)
 Best fire
 Pearl Harbor (2001)
 Best stunt coorindation - sequence
 Rush Hour 2 (2001)
 Best fight
 Best high work
 Best speciality stunt

2003 
Films in alphabetical order
 Blade II (2002)
 Best fight
 The Bourne Identity (2002)
 Best work with a vehicle
 Die Another Day (2002)
 Best overall stunt by a stunt woman
 Minority Report (2002)
 Best high work
 Red Dragon (2002)
 Best fire
 Windtalkers (2002)
 Best fire
 XXX (2002)
 Best overall stunt by a stunt man
 Best speciality stunt
 Best stunt coordinator or 2nd unit director
  (Germany, 2002) 
 Best action in a foreign film

2004 
Films in alphabetical order
 Bad Boys II (2003)
 Best stunt coordinator or 2nd unit director
 Best work with a vehicle
 The Italian Job (2003)
 Best speciality stunt
 The Last Samurai (2003)
 Best fire
 The Matrix Reloaded (2003)
 Best overall stunt by a stunt woman
 Pirates of the Caribbean: The Curse of the Black Pearl (2003)
 Best fight
 The Rundown (2003)
 Best high work
 Best overall stunt by a stunt man
  (German TV series, 2003-2005)
 Best action in a foreign film

2005 
Films in alphabetical order
 The Bourne Supremacy (2004)
 Best stunt coordinator or 2nd unit director
 Best work with a vehicle
 Kill Bill: Volume 2 (2004)
 Best fight
 Best overall stunt by a stunt woman
 The Punisher (2004)
 Best fire
 Spider-Man 2 (2004)
 Best overall stunt by a stunt man
 Starsky & Hutch (2004)
 Best high work
 Taxi (2004)
 Best speciality stunt
  (Germany, 2005) 
 Best action in a foreign film

2007 
Films in alphabetical order
 Casino Royale (2006)
 Best high work
 Best stunt coordinator or 2nd unit director
 Crank (2006)
 Best speciality stunt
 Letters from Iwo Jima (2006)
 Best fire
 Pirates of the Caribbean: Dead Man's Chest (2006)
 Best fight
 Superman Returns (2006)
 Best overall stunt by a stunt woman
 Talladega Nights: The Ballad of Ricky Bobby (2006)
 Best work with a vehicle
 You, Me and Dupree (2006)
 Hardest hit
 Alarm für Cobra 11 – Die Autobahnpolizei (German TV series, since 1996)
 Best action in a foreign film

2008 
Films in alphabetical order
 300 (2006)
 Best fight
 American Gangster (2007)
 Best fire
 The Bourne Ultimatum (2007)
 Best high work
 Best work with a vehicle
 Grindhouse (2007)
 Best overall stunt by a stunt woman
 Hot Rod (2007)
 Hardest hit
 Live Free or Die Hard (2007)
 Best stunt coordinator or 2nd unit director
 Seraphim Falls (2006)
 Best speciality stunt
 Flash Point (Hong Kong, 2007)
 Best action in a foreign film

2009 
Films in alphabetical order
 The Dark Knight (2008)
 Best fight
 Best high work
 Best speciality stunt
 Best stunt coordinator or 2nd unit director
 Best work with a vehicle
 Iron Man (2008)
 Best fire
 Hardest hit
 Wanted (2008)
 Best overall stunt by a stunt woman
 Alarm für Cobra 11 – Die Autobahnpolizei (German TV series, since 1996)
 Best action in a foreign film

2010 
Films in alphabetical order
 Fast & Furious (2009)
 Best stunt coordinator or 2nd unit director
 Best work with a vehicle
 I Love You, Beth Cooper (2009)
 Hardest hit
 Ninja Assassin (2009)
 Best fight
 Obsessed (2009)
 Best overall stunt by a stunt woman
 Push (2009)
 Best high work
 Sherlock Holmes (2009)
 Best fire
 Terminator Salvation (2009)
 Best speciality stunt
   (Russia, 2009)
 Best action in a foreign film

2011 
Films in alphabetical order
 The A-Team (2010)
 Hardest hit
 Date Night (2010)
 Best work with a vehicle
 The Expendables (2010)
 Best fire
 Inception (2010)
 Best fight
 Best stunt coordinator or 2nd unit director
 Predators (2010)
 Best high work
 Best speciality stunt
 Salt (2010)
 Best overall stunt by a stunt woman
 Alarm für Cobra 11 – Die Autobahnpolizei (German TV series, since 1996) 
 Best action in a foreign film

2012 
Films in alphabetical order
 Fast Five (2011)
 Best fight
 Best high work
 Best stunt coordinator or 2nd unit director
 Best work with a vehicle
 Fright Night (2011)
 Best fire
 Mission: Impossible – Ghost Protocol (2011)
 Hardest hit
 Thor (2011)
 Best overall stunt by a stunt woman
 Transformers: Dark of the Moon (2011)
 Best speciality stunt
 Alarm für Cobra 11 – Die Autobahnpolizei (German TV series, since 1996) 
 Best action in a foreign film

2013 
Films in alphabetical order
 The Avengers (2012)
 Best fight
 Hardest hit
 Best high work
 Best overall stunt by a stunt woman
 The Dark Knight Rises (2012)
 Best speciality stunt
 Best stunt rigging
 Skyfall (2012)
 Best stunt coordinator or 2nd unit director
 Best work with a vehicle
 Alarm für Cobra 11 – Die Autobahnpolizei (German TV series, since 1996) 
 Best action in a foreign film

2014 
Films in alphabetical order
 Fast & Furious 6 (2013)
 Best fight
 Best stunt coordinator or 2nd unit director
 A Good Day to Die Hard (2013)
 Best work with a vehicle
 Identity Thief (2013)
 Best overall stunt by a stunt woman
 Iron Man 3 (2013)
 Best high work
 Best speciality stunt
 Best stunt rigging
 Lone Survivor (2013)
 Hardest hit
 Stalingrad (Russia, 2013)
 Best action in a foreign film

2015 
Films in alphabetical order
 22 Jump Street (2014)
 Best high work
 Captain America: The Winter Soldier (2014)
 Hardest hit
 Best stunt coordinator or 2nd unit director
 Best stunt rigging
 Fury (2014)
 Best speciality stunt
 John Wick (2014)
 Best fight
 Need for Speed (2014)
 Best work with a vehicle
 X-Men: Days of Future Past (2014)
 Best overall stunt by a stunt woman
 Alarm für Cobra 11 – Die Autobahnpolizei (German TV series, since 1996) 
 Best action in a foreign film

2016 
Films in alphabetical order
 Furious 7 (2015)
 Best overall stunt by a stunt woman
 Best work with a vehicle
 Jupiter Ascending (2015)
 Best high work
 Kingsman: The Secret Service (2014)
 Best fight
 Mad Max: Fury Road (2015)
 Best speciality stunt
 Best stunt coordinator or 2nd unit director
 Best stunt rigging
 Mission: Impossible – Rogue Nation (2015)
 Hardest hit
 The Medal (Russian TV miniseries, 2015/16)
 Best action in a foreign film

2017 
Films in alphabetical order
 Captain America: Civil War (2016)
 Hardest hit
 Best high work
 Best overall stunt by a stunt woman
 Best stunt rigging
 Jason Bourne (2016)
 Best work with a vehicle
 Hacksaw Ridge (2016)
 Best fight
 Best speciality stunt
 Best stunt coordinator or 2nd unit director
 Alarm für Cobra 11 – Die Autobahnpolizei (German TV series, since 1996) 
 Best action in a foreign film

2018 
Films in alphabetical order
 Atomic Blonde (2017)
 Best fight
 Best high work
 Baby Driver (2017)
 Best work with a vehicle
 Dunkirk (2017)
 Best speciality stunt
 Kidnap (2017)
 Hardest hit
 Pirates of the Caribbean: Dead Men Tell No Tales (2017)
 Best stunt rigging
 Wonder Woman (2017)
 Best overall stunt by a stunt woman
 Best stunt coordinator or 2nd unit director
 Wolf Warrior 2 (China, 2017)
 Best action in a foreign film

2019 
Films in alphabetical order
 Ant-Man and the Wasp (2018)
 Best fight
 Aquaman (2018)
 Best overall stunt by a stunt woman
 Black Panther (2018)
 Best high work
 Deadpool 2 (2018)
 Best speciality stunt
 Hardest hit
 Mission: Impossible – Fallout (2018)
 Best stunt rigging
 Best stunt coordinator or 2nd unit director
 Venom (2018)
 Best work with a vehicle
 Taxi 5 (France, 2017)
 Best action in a foreign film

2020 
Films in alphabetical order
 6 Underground (2019)
 Best stunt rigging
 Ford v Ferrari (2019)
 Best work with a vehicle
 John Wick: Chapter 3 – Parabellum (2019)
 Best stunt coordinator or 2nd unit director
 Joker (2019)
 Hardest hit
 Once Upon a Time in Hollywood (2019)
 Best fight
 Best high work
 Best speciality stunt
 Best overall stunt by a stunt woman
 Tomiris (2019)
 Best action in a foreign film

In pop culture
In the 2007 videogame Stuntman: Ignition, a player can be nominated for the Taurus World Stunt Awards.

TV airings
The award ceremony is normally broadcast on American television channels such as Entertainment News (E!).
The awards show has also aired on AMC.

Other awards
In 2008 the Screen Actors Guild (SAG) added an awards category for stunt performers, "Best Stunt Ensembles in features and TV."

Stunt performers have lobbied for the creation of an Academy Award for stunt work, but little progress has been made.

References

External links 
 

American film awards
Stunt awards
Dietrich Mateschitz